The Standing Council of Irish Chiefs and Chieftains is an organisation which was established to bring together the surviving Chiefs of the Name from the Gaelic nobility of Ireland. As a republic, the Constitution of Ireland prohibits the conferring or recognition of "titles of nobility" by the Republic of Ireland.

History
On 5 October 1991 sixteen of the nineteen "bloodline chiefs" were received at Áras an Uachtaráin by the President of Ireland, Mary Robinson, along with the Chief Herald of Ireland and representation from the Irish Tourist Board. This was the first time in modern history that the bloodline chieftains of Ireland had gathered to form a council.

Maguire of Fermanagh, retired accountant Terence Maguire, was elected chairman of the Irish Chiefs Council for a three-year period while The O'Conor Don of Roscommon, retired businessman Denis O'Conor Don, was elected deputy-chairman.

In 1999, following a scandal, the Chief Herald of Ireland took advice from the Attorney General's Office that successions would no longer be given "courtesy recognition" or published in the Iris Oifigiúil. While some representatives had obtained courtesy recognition as Chiefs of the Name from the Chief Herald of Ireland, this practice was discontinued by 2003 – when the Attorney General noted that such recognitions in a Republican system  were unconstitutional and without basis in Irish law.

As of 2006, the Chairman of The Standing Council of Irish Chiefs and Chieftains was Dr. Hugo Ricciardi O'Neill, the ostensible head of the Clandeboye O'Neill dynasty, from a branch of that family which has been in Portugal since the 18th century.

See also
Standing Council of Scottish Chiefs

References

Ancient Irish dynasties
Irish royal families